The Commission for the Pacification of Larut, whose terms of reference, among others, was to arrange for an amicable settlement relating to the Larut tin mines, was established by Sir Andrew Clarke on 23 January 1874. The members of the Pacification Commission included Captain Samuel Dunlop, Frank Swettenham, William A. Pickering, John Frederick Adolphus McNair, Chung Keng Quee and Chin Seng Yam. The Commission was successful in freeing many women taken as captives during the Larut Wars (1862–73), getting stockades dismantled and getting the tin mining business going again. The commission's labours concluded in February, 1874.

The Commissioners after due investigation and deliberation decided to hand the mines in Klian Pauh (Taiping) over to the Hai Sans and the mines in Klian Bharu (Kamunting) to the Ghee Hins.

References

History of Perak
Wars involving pre-independence Malaysia
Mining in Malaysia